Kilcoole GAA is a Gaelic Athletic Association club located in Kilcoole, County Wicklow, Ireland. The club  fields teams in both hurling and Gaelic football.

History

Located in the town of Kilcoole, County Wicklow border, Kilcoole GAA Club was founded in 1885. The club's first major success came in 1929 when Kilcoole defeated Carnew Emmets to win the Wicklow SFC title. The club claimed further honours in this grade in 1939 and 1954. Kilcoole have also appeared in eight Wicklow SHC deciders without success, however, the club has claimed a range of other honours at all levels in both codes.

Honours

Wicklow Senior Football Championship (3): 1929, 1939, 1954
Wicklow Senior B Hurling Championship (2): 1992
Wicklow Intermediate Football Championship (2): 1950, 1992
Wicklow Intermediate Hurling Championship (3): 1982, 2004, 2020
Wicklow Junior A Football Championship (2): 1925, 1937
Wicklow Junior A Hurling Championship (4): 1953, 1957, 1972, 2002
Wicklow Junior B Football Championship (1): 1980
Wicklow Minor Hurling Championship (2): 1956, 1972

Notable players

 Jimmy Hatton

References

External link

 Kilcoole GAA website

Gaelic games clubs in County Wicklow
Hurling clubs in County Wicklow
Gaelic football clubs in County Wicklow